Agapanthia talassica is a species of longhorn beetle in the subfamily Lamiinae found only in Kazakhstan.

References

talassica
Beetles described in 1973
Endemic fauna of Kazakhstan
Beetles of Asia